Dorothy Guyver Britton, Lady Bouchier MBE (14 February 1922 – 25 February 2015) was born in Yokohama and went to the Yokohama International School, moved to the United States at the age of 11, and was educated in the United States and England, returning to Japan after the American Occupation. She was best known as a translator into English of Tetsuko Kuroyanagi's Madogiwa no Totto-chan as Totto-chan, the Little Girl at the Window, and Oku no Hosomichi by Basho: A Haiku Journey – Basho's Narrow Road to a Far Province. She was the author of The Japanese Crane: Bird of Happiness and co-author of National Parks of Japan.

Dorothy Britton was also a poet and composer, and was a pupil of Darius Milhaud. She was known for her popular album Japanese Sketches, in which Tetsuko Kuroyanagi's father is violin soloist.

Her husband, Air Vice Marshal Sir Cecil ("Boy") Bouchier, K.B.E., C.B., D.F.C. was the first commander of the Indian Air Force and a station commander during the Battle of Britain.

Lady Bouchier was appointed Member of the Order of the British Empire (MBE) in the 2010 Birthday Honours.

To commemorate her legacy, a street in Markham, Canada was named after her.

Selected translations
Tomiko Higa – The Girl with the White Flag
Tsuneo Hayashida – The Japanese Crane: Bird of Happiness
Ryūnosuke Akutagawa – The Spider's Thread and Other Stories
Matsuo Bashō - A Haiku Journey: Bashō's Narrow Road to a Far Province
Tetsuko Kuroyanagi – Totto-chan, the Little Girl at the Window
Princess Chichibu – The Silver Drum, A Japanese Imperial Memoir
Takashi Kojima – Rashomon and Other Stories
Chihiro Iwasaki – Chichiro's Album of Words and Pictures

References

Japanese–English translators
2015 deaths
Members of the Order of the British Empire
People from Yokohama
English women poets
English composers
English translators
Pupils of Darius Milhaud
1922 births

Literary translators